United Nations Security Council Resolution 260, adopted unanimously on November 6, 1968, after examining the application of the Republic of Equatorial Guinea for membership in the United Nations, the Council recommended to the General Assembly that the Republic of Equatorial Guinea be admitted.

See also
List of United Nations Security Council Resolutions 201 to 300 (1965–1971)

References
Text of the Resolution at undocs.org

External links
 

 0260
 0260
 0260
November 1968 events